John Burrough may refer to:

John Burrough (American football) – Former American football player
John Burrough (Cambridge University cricketer) (1873–1922), played for Cambridge University 1893–95 then other teams
John Burrough (Gloucestershire cricketer) (1904–1969), played for Oxford University 1924–26 and Gloucestershire 1924–37
John Burrough (rower) in 1938 British Empire Games
John Paul Burrough, Bishop of Mashonaland

See also
John Burroughs (disambiguation)